My Super D is a 2016 Philippine superhero fantasy drama television series starring Dominic Ochoa in his first leading role. The series was aired on ABS-CBN's Primetime Bida evening block and worldwide via The Filipino Channel from April 18, 2016, to July 15, 2016, replacing My Love Donna and Game ng Bayan.

A special weekly marathon of episodes entitled My Super D: Super Marathon was also aired every Saturday nights on Yey! channel from April 23, 2016, to July 16, 2016.

Synopsis

Super D (Richard Yap), a being from another planet who draws his power from a blue gem, is a superhero who saves the lives of many people, including a barangay captain named Dado (Ronnie Lazaro), who was inspired by the heroism of Super D and dedicates his life in serving others. Dado's wife Belen (Sylvia Sanchez) has a son named Dodong (Marc Santiago), who considers Super D his idol during his childhood, and met Nicole and Tony with whom he befriended.

Don Zulueta (Ronaldo Valdez), a crime lord who knows about Super D's secret, used a woman (Precious Lara Quigaman) to take Super D down. The superhero fell in love with the woman, without both of them knowing the crime lord's plan. Don Zulueta's criminal group manages to kill Super D, and to prove the superhero's death, the criminals led by his henchmen Fredo (Simon Ibarra) bombed a shopping mall, where Dado is among the casualties of the bombing.

Dodong (Dominic Ochoa) grew up as a hard-working man and ends up marrying Nicole (Bianca Manalo). They have a family with their only son Dennis (Marco Masa). One day, Dodong got involved into an accident at the construction site he was working in. Tony (Marvin Agustin) betrays Dodong by hiring a lawyer to arrest him and tries to take advantage of Nicole and Dennis for himself. Pablo (Nonie Buencamino), a graphic artist and trusted friend of the original Super D, comes to help Dodong become a real superhero, in order to save his son Dennis from a group of kidnappers. With Pablo's help, Dodong succeeds in finding the blue gem and transforms into the new Super D. After Super D defeats the kidnappers and rescues Dennis, Dodong will face the responsibilities of reuniting his own family and his duty as a superhero.

Cast and characters

Main cast
 Dominic Ochoa as Rudolfo "Dodong" B. Aguilar / Super D
 Marco Masa as Dennis R. Aguilar
 Bianca Manalo as Nicole Ramirez-Aguilar
 Marvin Agustin as Anthony "Tony" Yaneza / Zulu 2.0
 Sylvia Sanchez as Evelyn "Belen" Bermudez-Aguilar
 Nonie Buencamino as Pablo Mateo
 Ronaldo Valdez as Don Ramoncito "Ramon" Zulueta / Heneral Zulu

Supporting cast
 Myrtle Sarrosa as Cherry
 Jayson Gainza as Oscar
 Jason Francisco as Michael
 Marina Benipayo as Teresa Ramirez
 Simon Ibarra as Alfredo "Fredo" Suarez
 Bong Regala as Francis Ramirez
 Atoy Co as Mang Dick
 Ryan Rems as Steve
 Jef Gaitan as Apple
 Louise Gertrude as Peaches
 David Chua as Doc Oks
 Gerard Acao as Rocky
 Dentrix Ponce as Boyet
 Daniella Tolentino as Ika
 Cong TV as Moby

Guest cast
 Richard Yap as Delta / original Super D
 Ronnie Lazaro as Dado Aguilar
 Precious Lara Quigaman as Mikaela
 Marc Santiago as young Dodong Aguilar
 Cessa Moncera as young Nicole Ramirez
 JB Agustin as young Tony Yaneza
 Francis Magundayao as teenage Dodong Aguilar
 John Bermundo as teenage Michael
 Yuguz Garcia as young Dennis Aguilar
 Nhikzy Calma as young Boyet
 Myel de Leon as young Ikay
 Ping Medina as Mario Brother 1
 Alex Medina as Mario Brother 2
 Benj Manalo as Mario Brother 3
 Bradley Holmes
 Bernard Palanca as Pedro
 Sarah Lahbati as Ulah / Tiradora
 Niño Muhlach as Kiko / Negastar
 Fourth Solomon as Bill
 Fifth Solomon as Billy

Ratings

Production
My Super D is a superhero fantasy drama directed by Frasco Mortiz and Lino Cayetano. The series is Cayetano's comeback project after his three-year break from directing.

The concept behind My Super D according to the production staff is that "everyone can be a superhero regardless of physicality." According to Mortiz, My Super D is produced as a series "for all ages" citing that there are superhero-themed series aimed only for mature audience. Commenting on what constitutes a hero in context of the drama's production "When we say superhero, what instantly comes to mind is the conventional kind — strong and muscled body — but we must not forget that a superhero possesses a good heart, too, not just all muscles." He also remarked that there are action scenes yet these have very light treatment. Before the airing of pilot episode, Mortiz expressed his enthusiasm on the opportunity to teach values to children viewers through the show such as the importance of not forgetting to pray.

Casting
The drama marks the very first protagonist role for Dominic Ochoa after having played numerous supporting roles in teleseryes. The telenovela also includes Marco Masa who was best known for his lead role in the fantasy drama Nathaniel, and Bianca Manalo who was also known for her role as Tiffany in the romantic comedy On the Wings of Love. Marvin Agustin and veteran actor Ronaldo Valdez also starred as the main antagonists. Meanwhile, Sylvia Sanchez plays a special role in this series before she eventually played her very first protagonist role in the afternoon telenovela The Greatest Love for which Nonie Buencamino was also part of.

Scheduling
My Super D was reported to replace Pasión de Amor on February 29, 2016, but was postponed because of We Will Survive and moved to summer season. The telenovela finally premiered on April 18, 2016, on a pre-primetime slot, replacing the Korean drama My Love Donna. In addition, the short-lived game show Game ng Bayan got cancelled on April 15, 2016, and thus We Will Survive moved to Kapamilya Gold afternoon block on April 18, 2016.

See also
 List of programs broadcast by ABS-CBN
 List of ABS-CBN drama series

References

ABS-CBN drama series
Superhero television shows
Philippine action television series
Fantaserye and telefantasya
2016 Philippine television series debuts
2016 Philippine television series endings
Television series by Dreamscape Entertainment Television
Filipino-language television shows
Television shows filmed in the Philippines